Assahrij is a town in El Kelaa des Sraghna Province, Marrakech-Safi, Morocco. According to the 2004 census it has a population of 1,732.

References

Populated places in El Kelâat Es-Sraghna Province